The 2018–19 season was Crewe Alexandra's 142nd season in their history, their 95th in the English Football League and third consecutive in League Two. Along with competing in League Two, the club also participated in the 2018–19 FA Cup, 2018–19 EFL Cup and 2018–19 EFL Trophy.

The season covers the period from 1 July 2018 to 30 June 2019.

Competitions

Friendlies
The Railwaymen announced pre-season friendlies with Colwyn Bay, Barrow, Bala Town, Kidsgrove Athletic, Altrincham, Nantwich Town, Leek Town and Blackpool.

League Two

League table

Results summary

Results by matchday

Matches

FA Cup

The first round draw was made live on BBC by Dennis Wise and Dion Dublin on 22 October.

EFL Cup

On 15 June 2018, the draw for the first round was made in Vietnam.

EFL Trophy
On 13 July 2018, the initial group stage draw bar the U21 invited clubs was announced.

Transfers

Transfers in

Transfers out

Loans in

Loans out

References

Crewe Alexandra
Crewe Alexandra F.C. seasons